Proctoporus rahmi, Rahm's sun tegu, is a species of lizard in the family Gymnophthalmidae. It is endemic to Peru.

Etymology
The specific name, rahmi, is in honor of Peter Rahm who collected the holotype.

Geographic range

Reproduction
P. rahmi is oviparous.

References

Further reading
De Gris P (1936). "Prionodactylus rahmi, eine neue Eidechse aus den Anden [= Prionodactylus rahmi, a new lizard from the Andes]". Zoologische Anzeiger 116: 27–30. (Prionodactylus rahmi, new species). (in German).
Köhler G, Lehr E (2004). "Comments on Euspondylus and Proctoporus (Squamata: Gymnophthalmidae) from Peru, with the Description of Three New Species and a Key to the Peruvian Species". Herpetologica 60 (4): 501–518.
Torres-Carvajal O, Lobos SE, Venegas PJ, Chávez G, Aguirre-Peñafiel V, Zurita D, Echevarría LY (2016). "Phylogeny and biogeography of the most diverse clade of South American gymnophthalmid lizards (Squamata, Gymnophthalmidae, Cercosaurinae)". Molecular Phylogenetics and Evolution 99: 63–75. (Proctoporus rahmi, new combination).

Proctoporus
Reptiles of Peru
Endemic fauna of Peru
Reptiles described in 1936
Taxa named by Pedro De Grijs
Taxobox binomials not recognized by IUCN